The Braille pattern dots-6 is a 6-dot braille cell with the bottom right dot raised, or an 8-dot braille cell with the lower-middle right dot raised. It is represented by the Unicode code point U+2820, and in Braille ASCII with a comma:, .

Unified Braille

In unified international braille, the braille pattern dots-6 is used as a formatting, punctuation, accent sign, or otherwise as needed.

Table of unified braille values

Other braille

Plus dots 7 and 8

Related to Braille pattern dots-6 are Braille patterns 67, 68, and 678, which are used in 8-dot braille systems, such as Gardner-Salinas and Luxembourgish Braille.

Related 8-dot kantenji patterns

In the Japanese kantenji braille, the standard 8-dot Braille patterns 8, 18, 48, and 148 are the patterns related to Braille pattern dots-6, since the two additional dots of kantenji patterns 06, 67, and 067 are placed above the base 6-dot cell, instead of below, as in standard 8-dot braille.

Kantenji using braille patterns 8, 18, 48, or 148

This listing includes kantenji using Braille pattern dots-6 for all 6349 kanji found in JIS C 6226-1978.

  - N/A - used only as a selector

Selector

  -  な/亻 + selector 6  =  体
  -  な/亻 + な/亻 + selector 6  =  體
  -  仁/亻 + selector 6  =  像
  -  も/門 + selector 6  =  凶
  -  も/門 + selector 6 + selector 6  =  凵
  -  宿 + も/門 + selector 6  =  兇
  -  も/門 + も/門 + selector 6  =  匈
  -  に/氵 + も/門 + selector 6  =  洶
  -  心 + も/門 + selector 6  =  椶
  -  く/艹 + selector 6  =  卉
  -  と/戸 + selector 6  =  尸
  -  日 + selector 6  =  曰
  -  に/氵 + 日 + selector 6  =  沓
  -  き/木 + selector 6  =  本
  -  ち/竹 + き/木 + selector 6  =  笨
  -  み/耳 + き/木 + selector 6  =  躰
  -  日 + き/木 + selector 6  =  皋
  -  け/犬 + selector 6  =  猫
  -  囗 + selector 6  =  角
  -  れ/口 + 囗 + selector 6  =  嘴
  -  つ/土 + 囗 + selector 6  =  埆
  -  き/木 + 囗 + selector 6  =  桷
  -  心 + 囗 + selector 6  =  槲
  -  そ/馬 + selector 6  =  象
  -  そ/馬 + selector 6 + selector 6  =  豸
  -  そ/馬 + selector 6 + く/艹  =  貘
  -  心 + そ/馬 + selector 6  =  橡
  -  せ/食 + selector 6  =  酋
  -  心 + せ/食 + selector 6  =  楢
  -  ひ/辶 + せ/食 + selector 6  =  遒
  -  せ/食 + せ/食 + selector 6  =  鰌
  -  か/金 + selector 6  =  鉢
  -  心 + selector 6  =  黍
  -  selector 6 + そ/馬  =  丑
  -  け/犬 + selector 6 + そ/馬  =  狃
  -  か/金 + selector 6 + そ/馬  =  鈕
  -  selector 6 + selector 6 + そ/馬  =  豕
  -  selector 6 + に/氵  =  丞
  -  て/扌 + selector 6 + に/氵  =  拯
  -  selector 6 + さ/阝  =  乍
  -  る/忄 + selector 6 + さ/阝  =  怎
  -  selector 6 + て/扌  =  亭
  -  に/氵 + selector 6 + て/扌  =  渟
  -  selector 6 + 囗  =  亶
  -  selector 6 + り/分  =  僉
  -  ん/止 + selector 6 + り/分  =  歛
  -  ち/竹 + selector 6 + り/分  =  簽
  -  selector 6 + 宿  =  兌
  -  selector 6 + こ/子  =  公
  -  心 + selector 6 + こ/子  =  枩
  -  か/金 + selector 6 + こ/子  =  瓮
  -  ふ/女 + selector 6 + こ/子  =  舩
  -  む/車 + selector 6 + こ/子  =  蚣
  -  お/頁 + selector 6 + こ/子  =  頌
  -  selector 6 + 龸  =  几
  -  れ/口 + selector 6 + 龸  =  咒
  -  selector 6 + み/耳  =  呂
  -  き/木 + selector 6 + み/耳  =  梠
  -  も/門 + selector 6 + み/耳  =  閭
  -  心 + selector 6 + み/耳  =  櫚
  -  ち/竹 + selector 6 + み/耳  =  筥
  -  い/糹/#2 + selector 6 + み/耳  =  絽
  -  selector 6 + け/犬  =  失
  -  な/亻 + selector 6 + け/犬  =  佚
  -  selector 6 + selector 6 + け/犬  =  夸
  -  し/巿 + selector 6 + け/犬  =  帙
  -  み/耳 + selector 6 + け/犬  =  跌
  -  む/車 + selector 6 + け/犬  =  軼
  -  selector 6 + 心  =  奄
  -  に/氵 + selector 6 + 心  =  淹
  -  く/艹 + selector 6 + 心  =  菴
  -  も/門 + selector 6 + 心  =  閹
  -  selector 6 + る/忄  =  婁
  -  selector 6 + ⺼  =  孟
  -  selector 6 + う/宀/#3  =  宛
  -  selector 6 + selector 6 + う/宀/#3  =  彑
  -  selector 6 + は/辶  =  尚
  -  氷/氵 + selector 6 + は/辶  =  敞
  -  よ/广 + selector 6 + は/辶  =  廠
  -  心 + selector 6 + は/辶  =  棠
  -  に/氵 + selector 6 + は/辶  =  淌
  -  ね/示 + selector 6 + は/辶  =  裳
  -  selector 6 + 仁/亻  =  尤
  -  ⺼ + selector 6 + 仁/亻  =  肬
  -  selector 6 + selector 6 + 仁/亻  =  无
  -  selector 6 + つ/土  =  尭
  -  に/氵 + selector 6 + つ/土  =  澆
  -  く/艹 + selector 6 + つ/土  =  蕘
  -  selector 6 + い/糹/#2  =  尹
  -  ち/竹 + selector 6 + い/糹/#2  =  笋
  -  selector 6 + と/戸  =  廾
  -  selector 6 + め/目  =  弗
  -  と/戸 + selector 6 + め/目  =  髴
  -  selector 6 + ゆ/彳  =  弯
  -  selector 6 + selector 6 + ゆ/彳  =  彎
  -  selector 6 + ひ/辶  =  戍
  -  selector 6 + selector 6 + ひ/辶  =  柬
  -  selector 6 + し/巿  =  曳
  -  い/糹/#2 + selector 6 + し/巿  =  絏
  -  selector 6 + selector 6 + し/巿  =  曵
  -  selector 6 + 氷/氵  =  曷
  -  selector 6 + ん/止  =  焉
  -  ふ/女 + selector 6 + ん/止  =  嫣
  -  selector 6 + か/金  =  瓦
  -  の/禾 + selector 6 + か/金  =  甃
  -  も/門 + selector 6 + か/金  =  甌
  -  う/宀/#3 + selector 6 + か/金  =  甍
  -  そ/馬 + selector 6 + か/金  =  甑
  -  ま/石 + selector 6 + か/金  =  甓
  -  ひ/辶 + selector 6 + か/金  =  甕
  -  selector 6 + ほ/方  =  甫
  -  ⺼ + selector 6 + ほ/方  =  脯
  -  ひ/辶 + selector 6 + ほ/方  =  逋
  -  せ/食 + selector 6 + ほ/方  =  鯆
  -  selector 6 + よ/广  =  疋
  -  selector 6 + む/車  =  矣
  -  な/亻 + selector 6 + む/車  =  俟
  -  ん/止 + selector 6 + む/車  =  欸
  -  ま/石 + selector 6 + む/車  =  竢
  -  selector 6 + な/亻  =  竟
  -  selector 6 + の/禾  =  而
  -  の/禾 + selector 6 + の/禾  =  粫
  -  selector 6 + ら/月  =  胡
  -  心 + selector 6 + ら/月  =  楜
  -  む/車 + selector 6 + ら/月  =  蝴
  -  せ/食 + selector 6 + ら/月  =  餬
  -  selector 6 + ぬ/力  =  臼
  -  け/犬 + selector 6 + ぬ/力  =  舂
  -  selector 6 + も/門  =  芻
  -  く/艹 + selector 6 + も/門  =  蒭
  -  selector 6 + く/艹  =  莫
  -  の/禾 + selector 6 + く/艹  =  糢
  -  む/車 + selector 6 + く/艹  =  蟆
  -  selector 6 + selector 6 + く/艹  =  屮
  -  selector 6 + え/訁  =  袁
  -  selector 6 + ま/石  =  辟
  -  ふ/女 + selector 6 + ま/石  =  嬖
  -  く/艹 + selector 6 + ま/石  =  薜
  -  心 + selector 6 + ま/石  =  蘗
  -  み/耳 + selector 6 + ま/石  =  躄
  -  selector 6 + ち/竹  =  采
  -  selector 6 + selector 6 + ち/竹  =  釆
  -  selector 6 + れ/口  =  鬲
  -  selector 6 + selector 6 + す/発  =  乕
  -  selector 6 + selector 6 + や/疒  =  鬯
  -  selector 6 + selector 4 + ね/示  =  劒
  -  む/車 + selector 6 + ろ/十  =  蝨

Notes

Braille patterns